Eloise Smith (born 2 January 1978) is a British fencer. She competed in the women's individual foil event at the 2000 Summer Olympics. She was Commonwealth fencing champion in Individual Women's Foil in 1998 and 2002.
From 1997 to 2004, she represented Great Britain at every World Fencing Championships and was British Individual Women's Foil No. 1. 
She was coached by Ziemowit Wojciechowski at Salle Paul.

She attended Haberdashers' Aske's School for Girls, Elstree, before studying English Literature and Language at St Edmund Hall, Oxford, where she graduated in 1999.

In January 2014, she was appointed Executive Creative Director at digital marketing agency MullenLowe Profero.

International competitions

Education
Eloise attended Haberdashers' Aske's School for Girls, Elstree, before studying English Literature and Language at St Edmund Hall, Oxford, where she graduated in 1999. In 2001, she studied at West Herts College for a diploma in Copywriting and Art Direction for Advertising.

Career
Eloise began her career in advertising at marketing and communications company RKCR/ Y&R in 2001 as a creative. In 2004, she moved to St Luke's Communications, followed by digital agency AKQA and digital and social marketing agency Work Club as a creative lead. Here she created The Carte Noire Readers featuring Dominic West, Joseph Fiennes and more.

In 2010, she moved to advertising agency Havas London as a creative director. Notable clients included Citroën, Kraft and evian.

In January 2014, she was appointed Executive Creative Director at digital marketing agency MullenLowe Profero. 

She then became joint Executive Creative Director at  MullenLowe London in 2016.

Writing
Eloise's debut middle-grade fiction title, Sister To A Star, was published by Chicken House Books in May 2022.

References

External links
 

1978 births
Living people
People educated at Haberdashers' Girls' School
British female fencers
Olympic fencers of Great Britain
Fencers at the 2000 Summer Olympics
Alumni of St Edmund Hall, Oxford